Mood is a mixtape by American R&B singer Jacquees, released on January 10, 2016. The mixtape features guest appearances from rappers  Kevin Gates, Dej Loaf, Young Scooter, Kirko Bangz, Rich Homie Quan and Birdman. Production was mostly handled by Nash B and hosted by DJ Spinz.

Track listing

References

2016 mixtape albums
Jacquees albums